Swimming at the 2017 European Youth Summer Olympic Festival was held in July 2017 in Győr, Hungary.

Medal events

Boys' events

Girls' events

Mixed events

References

European Youth Summer Olympic Festival
Swimming
Swimming competitions in Hungary
2017